Nicole Willis (born 1963) is an American singer-songwriter, producer, director, and visual artist. Willis lives and works in Helsinki, Finland.

Biography

Professional 
Willis contributed vocals in London, United Kingdom in 1985 with Washington Week in Review. Prior to that she was a member of The Hello Strangers and Blue Period with Spike Priggen, Jean Caffiene and Mark Mulcahy performances at Munson Diner and Danceteria's No Entiendes, based in New York City while working at night clubs Berlin and Danceteria.  In 1984, Willis performed as lead vocalist with Jenn Vix on backing vocals, Adam Horovitz on electric bass, Phil Painson on drums and David Strahan on electric guitar, called Disco Donut. Willis toured with The The as a backup and lead vocalist in 1989. Nicole Willis was the lead vocalist of the nu-soul group Repercussions. Singles and albums were released on Mo' Wax, Reprise/Warner Brothers USA, Pony Canyon Japan. Producers of those records include Nicole Willis, Gary Katz, Daniel Wyatt, Genji Siraisi, and Gordon Clay. The single Promise Me Nothing from the debut album of Repercussions LP Earth and Heaven, peaked at number 6 in the Hot Dance Music, Club Play chart of Billboard magazine on March 18, 1995. Together with Curtis Mayfield, the band recorded a version of Mayfield's Let's Do It Again in which Willis sings a duet with Curtis Mayfield in 1994 released on Reprise/Warner Brothers Records. The group also released an album on Pony Canyon Japan, titled Charmed Life in 1997.

Willis has collaborated with Leftfield singing and writing lead vocals for Swords on the Rhythm and Stealth LP in 1999 on Hard Hands/Higher Ground/Sony BMG Records, which was also featured on the soundtrack for the film Go released 1999. The LP Rhythm and Stealth received a Platinum Sales Award in the United Kingdom. An instrumental remix was included in a single release by Two Lone Swordsmen, an electronic duo consisting of Andrew Weatherall and Keith Tenniswood. Willis has sung lead vocals to the track Call of the Wild on the Jimi Tenor album Out Of Nowhere in 2000 on Warp Records. Willis collaborated with Nuspirit Helsinki, with writing and vocal on the track Honest from the self-titled album Nuspirit Helsinki released 2002 on Guidance Recordings. Willis also wrote and sang vocals on the track Are You Ready To Party? with Mr Comicstore in 2006 on Mamushi Records. Willis collaborated with Flexatones Originals on tracks, Cause I Want & Fresh released on Fat Belt Records in 2007. Willis has contributed lead vocals to the Shawn Lee track Jigsaw featured on the album Soul in the Hole released in 2009 on Ubiquity Records. She has also sung vocals on the track A Little Bit Of Soap on the new album from Pizzicato Five's Yasuharu Konishi solo project titled Pizzicato One. The album titled One And Ten Very Sad Songs was released on May 25, 2011, on Universal Music in Japan. Willis collaborated with Jimi Tenor & Abdissa Assefa on track Leatheries from their LP Itetune released in 2011 on Temmi Kongi Records, contributing spoken words and poetry. Willis wrote lyrics and sang on the track Bad For Me by Bosq featuring Nicole Willis released by Ubiquity Records in 2014.

Willis collaborated with artist Sophie Calle for her installation Take Care Of Yourself with a performance in time-based media in 2007, which exhibited at the French Pavilion of the Venice Biennale in 2007. Willis also contributed vocals to time-based media performance Rinologia of Barcelona-based artist group Los Rinos who are artists Marcel.lí Antúnez, Pau Nubiola and film director, Sergi Caballero. Rinologia was performed at the BEM Festival in Burgos, Spain in March 2007. Willis had two of her first solo exhibitions of oil paintings, in 2012, first of which were in March 2012 at Galleria Kingi Kongi in Helsinki, Finland and in November 2012 at Pirkko-Liisa Topeliuksen Galleria, also in Helsinki, both titled Gatherings. Willis will have a solo exhibition at Gallery Emil in Tampere, Finland titled Talking Trash; February 2, 2014 – February 28, 2014. Willis contributed 10 jewel cases, painted in acrylic and one musical track, of ten musicians/visual artists musical contribution, Do the Watusi (written by Jimi Tenor, Pete Toikkanen & Nicole Willis) to curator/artist Jaakko Tuomainen's group exhibition Soundtrack for Painting from September 1 to 30, 2012, at the Lahti Modern Art Kiosk, in Lahti, Finland. Willis has contributed a painting to a group exhibition to be shown from July 18 to August 11, 2013, in London, United Kingdom's A Side B Side Gallery, curated by artists Chloe Mortimer & Harry Pye, titled ELVIS: I Love You Because of which the subject is Elvis Presley.

On Puu/Sähko Recordings, Willis released her first solo albums Soul Makeover 2000 and Be It 2003. On those solo records Willis collaborated with producers and songwriters such as Dharma One, Ercola, Nuspirit Helsinki, Jimi Tenor and Maurice Fulton. Willis and Tenor remixed Op*l Bastards single Funking in 2001 on Form and Function Records. In 2005 Willis collaborated with the Soul Investigators and released Keep Reachin Up on Helsinki's Timmion Records, produced by Didier Selin. The LP Keep Reachin' Up was critically acclaimed. The album has been since released in the United Kingdom on Above The Clouds Records, France, Benelux, Denmark, Spain and Italy on Differ-ant, USA and Canada on Light in the Attic Records in the years 2006 & 2007. Their song Feeling Free was chosen 2006 Worldwide Winner on the Gilles Peterson's BBC show.

The title track of the album Keep Reachin' Up was chosen by US President Barack Obama, as one of many songs on his Re-Election Campaign Spotify Playlist, in February 2012.
The track If This Ain't Love(Don't Know What Is) was placed in the USA TV channel ABC's show Brothers & Sisters in season 2, episode 1 in 2007. The track No One's Gonna Love You was placed in Showtime's Ray Donovan in season 1, episode 3, Twerk in 2013.

Nicole Willis & the Soul Investigators released an album, titled Tortured Soul in 2013 on Timmion Records in Finland, France, United Kingdom and other regions in the EU & North America, distribution by Differ-Ant S.A.R.L. – France, Groove Attack GmbH – Germany, Austria, Switzerland, Kudos Records Ltd – UK & Light in the Attic, USA. Tortured Soul received 4 out of 5 stars in a review at Finland's major national newspaper, Helsingin Sanomat'''s Nyt magazine. Tortured Soul entered the Official Finnish Music Charts in its first week after release at number 8 in week 7 of 2013. On May 10, 2013, Willis and Jimi Tenor released album Enigmatic by their project Cola & Jimmu on her new record label Herakles Records, Finland. The digital format is available worldwide, CD and vinyl are distributed worldwide by Word And Sound Medien GmbH. Cola & Jimmu on Herakles Records went on to release a follow up titled I Give To You My Love & Devotion in 2014. The single Open Up Your Chakra  peaked at position 21 in Japan's J-Wave HOT 100 Chart in June 2014.

Timmion Records released the third Nicole Willis & The Soul Investigators album titled Happiness in Every Style in October 2015, produced and written by Nicole Willis & The Soul Investigators. Happiness in Every Style received 5 out of 5 stars in Finland's major newspaper Helsingin Sanomat. Jimi Tenor was also a composer and arranger on the album. A single titled Paint Me in a Corner/Where Are You Now was released in April 2015. Singles One in Million and Let's Communicate followed in August and October 2015. The 12″ disco single Hot Sauce was released in November 2015.

Sahco Records released a single by Nicole Willis and Jimi Tenor featuring Tony Allen titled "All For You" with a B-side by Nicole Willis and Jimi Tenor titled "Touching" in November 2015.

Singles in collaboration with Bosq of the Whiskey Barons were released on Ubiquity Records, Bad for Me (12″ single) in 2015 and Take Me There, AA-side to Megan Doherty's lead vocal on A-side Can't Seem To Hide (12″ single).

Willis announced on April 16, 2017, that she will no longer be collaborating with the instrumental group The Soul Investigators on Facebook.

Willis released on her new sublabel Persephone Records (Herakles Records) the EP Big Fantasy (For Me) / Tear It Down, a collaboration of Willis, Jimi Tenor and Jonathan Maron (electric bass player) on March 31, 2017. It was distributed by Kudos Records.

She announced the release date of her next LP My Name Is Nicole Willis, the second release for Persephone Records as September 29, 2017, distributed by Kudos Records. The album is a collaboration with UMO Jazz Orchestra, composed of songs written by Willis, guitarist Pete Toikkanen and Jimi Tenor as well as from her catalogue with The Soul Investigators. Ian Svenonius is featured on the prologue as well as epilogue tracks of the album. The album is produced by Willis, mixes assisted by herself with Jimi Tenor, while Jimi Tenor and Ilari Larjosto engineered and recorded. My Name Is Nicole Willis received a 4 star review in Helsingin Sanomat.

A new live project, Nicole Willis & Banda Palomita, is set to premiere at party promoted by Herra Herkules, Sexy Helle at Siltanen in Helsinki, June 28, 2017.
. The line up included Abdissa Assefa on percussion, Ndioba Gueye on electric bass, Julius Heikkilä on electric guitar, Antti Kujanpää on keyboards and Ilari Larjosto on drum kit.

In February 2019, Nicole Willis released an album called My Soul Sensation with a hand picked line up titled Banda Palomita. The group are Ms Willis, Ndioba Gueye, Julius Heikkilä, Antti Kujanpää, Ilari Larjosto and Luiz Orlando Sá Do Carmo on percussion.

In 2019, Ms Willis began to record a solo record with Kalifornia-Keke (Niko Linnamaa) at Suomenlinna Studios. It is slated for a 2021 release.

Education
Willis graduated with a Bachelor of Fine Arts from her studies at Lahti Institute of Fine Arts, Lahti University of Applied Sciences with professor Markus Heikkerö in Finland, and Erasmus studies at Sir John Cass Department of Art, London Metropolitan University in the United Kingdom, in 2008 & completed in 2009. Willis' concentration in her studies were oil painting, time-based media and performance. Willis graduated from the High School of Art and Design in 1980.

Discography

Albums
2019:  My Soul Sensation –  lead & backing vocals, lyrics, composer, producer, executive producer (as Nicole Willis & Banda Palomita) LP/Digital, Persephone Records, Finland
2017: My Name Is Nicole Willis –  lead vocals & backing vocals, lyrics, composer, producer (as Nicole Willis & UMO Jazz Orchestra) LP/CD/Digital, Persephone Records, Finland
2015: Happiness in Every Style –  lead & backing vocals, lyrics, composer, producer(as Nicole Willis & The Soul investigators) LP/CD/Digital, Timmion Records, Finland
2014: I Give To You My Love & Devotion –  lead & backing vocals, lyrics, composer, producer (as Cola & Jimmu) LP/CD/Digital, Herakles Records, Finland
2013: Enigmatic –  lead & backing vocals, lyrics, composer, producer (as Cola & Jimmu) LP/CD/Digital, Herakles Records, Finland
2013: Tortured Soul –  lead & backing vocals, lyrics, composer (as Nicole Willis and the Soul Investigators) LP/CD/MC, Timmion Records, Finland (peak FIN #8)
2007: Keep Reachin' Up Remixed –  lead & backing vocals, lyrics, composer (as Nicole Willis and the Soul Investigators) LP/CD, Above The Clouds Records, UK
2005: Keep Reachin Up –  lead & backing vocals, lyrics, composer (as Nicole Willis and the Soul Investigators) LP/CD/MC, Timmion Records, Finland
2004: Be It –  lead & backing vocals, lyrics, composer, producer LP/CD, Puu/Sähkö Recordings, Finland
2000: Soul Makeover –  lead vocals, lyrics, composer, producer LP/CD, Puu/Sähkö Recordings, Finland
1997: Charmed Life –  lead & backing vocals, lyrics, composer, producer (Repercussions) CD, Pony Canyon Records, Japan
1995: Earth and Heaven –  lead vocals, lyrics, composer, producer (Repercussions) LP/CD, Warner Brothers/Reprise, USA

Singles I Call Your Name Smoove Remix (Radio Edit) / I Call Your Name Smoove Remix (Original) / I Call Your Name Smoove Remix (Instrumental) –  Persephone Records (PERSE008DD) – 2019 (Nicole Willis & Banda Palomita) – Digital, lead & backing vocals, lyrics/ composer, producer, executive producer.  Reparate (Original) / Reparate (Instrumental) –  Persephone Records (PERSE007DD) – 2019 (Nicole Willis & Banda Palomita) – Digital, lead & backing vocals, lyrics/composer, producer, executive producer. I Call Your Name (Original) / I Call Your Name (Instrumental) – Persephone Records (PERSE006DD) – 2019 (Nicole Willis & Banda Palomita) – Digital, lead & backing vocals, lyrics/composer, producer.An Angel on My Shoulder / And I'll Be Free As A Bird – Persephone Records (PERSE004) – 2018 (Crown Of Brahma ft Nicole Willis) – 7″, lead & backing vocals, lyrics/composer, producer.Big Fantasy (For Me) / Tear It Down – Persephone Records (HRKL006LP) – 2017 (Big Fantasy (For Me) – Radio Edit – Original – Instrumental, Tear It Down – Radio Edit – Original – Instrumental – 12″, lead & backing vocals, lyrics/composer, producer.Say It – Puu/Sähkö  (Puu-30) – 2003 (A1: Original version, A2: Dharmaone Remix, B1: We Won't Miss a Thing (Nuspirit Remix)) – 12″, lead & backing vocals, lyrics/composer, producer.Siesta/Heed The Sign – Puu/Sähkö  (Puu-28) – 2002 (Siesta A1: Roberto Rodriguez remix, A2: Temple Of Soul NYC remix/Heed The Sign B1: Jimi Tenor remix, B2: GusGus remix) – 12″, lead & backing vocals, lyrics/composer, producer.Curiosity – Puu/Sähkö (Puu-23) – 2001 (A1: Candy Apple Remix, A2: Zanzibar Remix, B1: Jimi Tenor Remix, B2: Jan Cooley Remix, B3: HK's Punkhouse Remix – 12″, lead & backing vocals, lyrics/composer, producer.All The Time – Sähkö/Puu (Puu-20) – 2000 (A1: Roberto Rodriguez R&B mix, A2: Jori Hulkkonen House mix, B1: Radio Edit / Album Version, B2: Jimi Tenor Dub feat. Chris Dawkins, B3: Accordion Dept. mix) – 12″, lead & backing vocals, lyrics/composer, producer.
Swords (Leftfield song) - (with Leftfield - 2000) - Hard Hands/Chrysalis/Sony Music (HANDO59CD) (01: Swords [Radio Edit], 02: Swords [Two Lone Swordsmen Remix], 03: Swords [Leftfield Exit Remix], 04: Swords [Video Version] - Maxi CD, vocals, lyrics/composer. Love, Again (with Repercussions - 1997) - Canyon International (PCCY-01192), lead & backing vocals, lyrics, composer, producer.Promise Me Nothing – (with Repercussions – 1995) – Warner Brothers/Reprise (WO 284T) (A1: Promise Me Nothing, Masters at Work Mix Remix – Masters at Work, A2: Promise Me Nothing (Bass Hit Dub) Remix – Masters at Work – B1: Promise Me Nothing (Dusk Till Dawn Sampladelic Remix) Remix – DJ Tennessee, Super DJ Dimitry*, B2: Promise Me Nothing (H-Man's Old Skool Dub) Remix – Hani, B3: Promise Me Nothing [Album Version] ) – 12″, Super DJ Dmitry is misspelled as Super DJ Dimitry on the label and sleeve.(peak # 6 Hot Dance Music, Club Play chart of Billboard), - 12", lead & backing vocals, lyrics/composer, producer.Let's Do It Again – (with Curtis Mayfield & Repercussions – 1994) – Reprise/Warner Brothers Records (PRO-A-6771, PRO-A6771-R, PRO-CD-6930-R), (A1: Let's Do It Again (Edit) B2: Let's Do It Again [Album Version] ) – CD Single, Promo, 12" Single, PromoPromise/Field Trippin' – (with Repercussions – 1992) – Mo’ Wax (MW001) – 12″

Collaborations
Nicole Willis & UMO Jazz Orchestra; 7″ single Haunted by the Devil / (Everybody) Do The Watusi (Persephone Records, 2018) lead & backing vocals, lyrics/composer, producer.
Nicole Willis & UMO Jazz Orchestra; 7″ single Still Got A Way To Fall (Ronet Records, 2017) lead & backing vocals, lyrics/composer, producer.
Nicole Willis, Jimi Tenor & Jonathan Maron; EP Big Fantasy (For Me)/Tear It Down (Persephone Records, 2017) lead & backing vocals, lyrics/composer, instrumentation, producer.
Bosq ft. Megan Doherty & Nicole Willis; 12″ single Can't Seem To Hide /Take Me There (Ubiquity Records, 2017) lead & backing vocals, lyrics/composer.
  Bosq ft. Nicole Willis; 12″ single Bad For Me (Ubiquity Records, 2015) lead & backing vocals, lyrics/composer.
  Nicole Willis, Jimi Tenor featuring Tony Allen/Nicole Willis & Jimi Tenor; single All For You/Touching (Sahco Records, 2015) lead vocals, lyrics/composer.
  Pizzicato One; LP One And Ten Very Sad Songs, on track A Little Bit Of Soap (Universal Music, 2011) lead vocals.
  Jimi Tenor & Abdissa Assefa; LP Itetune; on track Leatheries (Temmi Kongi, 2011) spoken word, author.
  Shawn Lee; LP Soul in the Hole, on track Jigsaw (Ubiquity Records, 2009) lead & backing vocals.
  The Flexatones Originals; on tracks Fresh & Cause I Want (Fat Belt Records, 2007) lead & backing vocals, lyrics/composer.
  Mr. Comicstore; Single Are You Ready To Party? (Mamushi Records, 2006) lead & backing vocals, lyrics/composer.
  Nuspirit Helsinki, LP Nuspirit Helsinki; Honest (Guidance Recordings, 2002) lead & backing vocals, lyrics/composer.
  Op:l Bastards; Single Funking, a remix of Funking from Nicole Willis and Jimi Tenor.  Op:l Bastards single(Form & Function, 2001)
  Jimi Tenor; LP Out Of Nowhere, on tracks Spell & Call Of The Wild. (Warp, 2000) lead vocals, lyrics.
  Leftfield; LP Rhythm and Stealth, on track Swords (Hard Hands/Chrysalis/Sony Music, 1999) lead vocals, lyrics/composer.

Music videosOne In A Million (as Nicole Willis & The Soul Investigators) Aleksi Raij: director 2015Earthly Delights (as Cola & Jimmu) Cola & Jimmu: director 2014Open Up Your Chakra (as Cola & Jimmu) Cola & Jimmu: director 2014Transcend Our Love (as Cola & Jimmu) Cola & Jimmu: director 2014No More Wars (as Cola & Jimmu) Cola & Jimmu: director 2014369° Grind (as Cola & Jimmu) Nicole Willis: director 2013Enigmatic (as Cola & Jimmu) Jimi Tenor: director 2013Brooklyn Girl (as Cola & Jimmu) Jimi Tenor: director 2013Time To Get Business Straight (as Nicole Willis & the Soul Investigators) Tony Sheng: director 2013Break Free (Shake a Tail Feather) (as Nicole Willis & the Soul Investigators) Tony Sheng: director 2013If This Ain’t Love (Don’t Know What Is) (as Nicole Willis & the Soul Investigators) Vincent Scotet: director 2007Let's Do It Again  (as Curtis Mayfield & Repercussions) 1994Make No Mistake (as an extra; Keith Richards) 1988Keep On Movin (as an extra; Soul II Soul) 1988Happy Ever After (as an extra; Julia Fordham) 1988Rock Box (as an extra; RUN-DMC) 1984

Singles with The Soul Investigators Hot Sauce (Original)/Hot Sauce (Instrumental) – Timmion Records (2015) – 12″Let's Communicate (Original)/Let's Communicate (Instrumental) – Timmion Records (2015) – 7″One in a Million (Original)/One in a Million (Instrumental) – Timmion Records (2015) – 7″Paint Me in a Corner/Where Are You Now – Timmion Records (2015) – 7″Tell Me When/It's All Because Of You – Timmion Records (2012) – 7″My Four Leaf Clover/Holdin' On – Timmion Records (2006) – 7″Feeling Free (Original)/Feeling Free (Instrumental) – Timmion Records (2006) – 7″Perfect Kind of Love – Timmion Records (2005) – CDS / 7″ (peak FIN #15)If This Ain't Love (Original)/If This Ain't Love (Instrumental) – Timmion Records (2005) – CDS / 7″ (peak FIN #4)You Better Change/Raw Steaks'' (feat. Jimmy Tenor) – Sahco Records (2003) – 7″

References

External links
 – official site
Nicole Willis & UMO Jazz Orchestra on Persephone Records
Nicole Willis on Timmion Records

1963 births
African-American women singer-songwriters
American artists
American expatriates in Finland
Living people
Repercussions (band) members
Singers from New York City
21st-century African-American people
21st-century African-American women
20th-century African-American people
Singer-songwriters from New York (state)
20th-century African-American women